Barbizon is a commune (town) in the Seine-et-Marne department in north-central France. It is located near the Fontainebleau Forest.

Demographics
The inhabitants are called Barbizonais.

Art history
The Barbizon school of painters is named after the village; Théodore Rousseau and Jean-François Millet, leaders of the school, made their homes and died in the village. Leon Trotsky also lived here for a short time.

International relations

Twin towns
 East Bergholt, England
 Szentendre, Hungary

Friendship cities
 Asago, Hyogo prefecture, Japan

See also
Communes of the Seine-et-Marne department
List of works by Henri Chapu

References

External links

 Barbizon website
1999 Land Use, from IAURIF (Institute for Urban Planning and Development of the Paris-Île-de-France région) 
 

Communes of Seine-et-Marne